Charanchi (or Cheranchi) is a town and Local Government Area (LGA) in Katsina State, northern Nigeria. The town, on the A9 highway, is the headquarters of the LGA. The chairman of the LGA is Dr.Badamasi Lawal Charanchi, the population is approximately 79,000 (2003), and the area is 471 km.
The local government was created from the former Rimi local government in 1996. Currently there are 11 councillors representing their wards in the administration of the local government council. These councillors have the right to impeach the Local Government Chairman in case of any misconduct or misappropriation of the government's fund.

There are two district heads in the Local government; Sarkin Shanun Katsina the district head of Charanchi and Sarkin Kurayen Katsina the district head of Kuraye.

Other towns 
Other towns in the LGA include Kuraye, Banye, Radda, Koda, Ganuwa, Yana, sabon Gari and Maje.

References

External links 
 Charanchi LGA

Local Government Areas in Katsina State